This is a list of '''Gardner–Webb Runnin' Bulldogs football players in the NFL Draft.

Key

Selections
Source:

References

Lists of National Football League draftees by college football team

Gardner-Webb Runnin' Bulldogs NFL Draft